The 25th Torino Film Festival was held 23 November – 1 December 2007 in Turin, Italy and was directed by Nanni Moretti.

Films in competition
The Art of Negative Thinking (Bård Breien)
Away from Her (Sarah Polley)
The Blue Hour (Eric Nazarian)
The Elephant and the Sea (Woo Ming Jin)
Free Fly (Janis Kalejs, Janis Putnins, Gatis Smits, Anna Viduleja)
Garage (Leonard Abrahamson)
The Home Song Stories (Tony Ayres)
The Woven Stories of the Other (Sherad Anthony Sanchez)
Lars and the Real Girl (Craig Gillespie)
Lino (Jean-Louis Milesi)
Neandertal (Ingo Haeb, Jan-Christoph Glaser)
Noise (Matthew Saville)
The Railroad (Park Heung-sik)
The Savages (Tamara Jenkins)
Water Lilies (Céline Sciamma)

Awards
Prize of the City of Torino:
Garage (Leonard Abrahamson)
Jury Special Prize:
Film: The Elephant and the Sea (Woo Ming Jin)
Best Actress: Joan Chen (The Home Song Stories)
Best Actor:
Kim Kang-woo (The Railroad)
Best Female Performance:
Joan Chen (The Home Song Stories)
Best Italian Short Film of the Year:
Giganti (Fabio Mollo)
FIPRESCI Award:
The Railroad (Park Heung-sik)

References

External links

2007 Torino Film Festival at the Internet Movie Database

Torino
Torino
Torino
Torino Film Festival